Janou Lefèbvre (later Tissot, born 14 May 1945) is a retired French equestrian show jumper. She competed at the 1964, 1968 and 1972 Olympics and won team silver medals in 1964 and 1968. She won the individual world title in 1970 as Lefèbvre and in 1974 as Tissot, as she got married and changed her surname in between.

References

External links

 

1945 births
Living people
Sportspeople from Ho Chi Minh City
French female equestrians
Olympic equestrians of France
Olympic silver medalists for France
Equestrians at the 1964 Summer Olympics
Equestrians at the 1968 Summer Olympics
Equestrians at the 1972 Summer Olympics
Olympic medalists in equestrian
Medalists at the 1968 Summer Olympics
Medalists at the 1964 Summer Olympics